Scary Movie 2 is a 2001 American supernatural parody film directed by Keenen Ivory Wayans. It is the sequel to Scary Movie and the second film in the Scary Movie film series. The film stars Anna Faris, Regina Hall, Shawn Wayans and Marlon Wayans (all reprising their roles from the first film, despite their characters having seemingly been killed off), as well as Tim Curry, Tori Spelling, Chris Elliott, Chris Masterson, Kathleen Robertson, David Cross and James Woods.

The film is the last in the series to feature the involvement of stars Marlon and Shawn Wayans, and director Keenan. Marlon would eventually go on to produce a similar horror-themed parody, A Haunted House, and its sequel, both starring himself. In the latter film, Wayans pokes fun at the Scary Movie series' decline in quality after his family's departure.

Where the original film was mainly based on the slasher films of the 1990s, Scary Movie 2 parodies an array of supernatural and haunted house films from various decades, namely The Haunting (1999), Stigmata (1999), The Exorcist (1973), The Rocky Horror Picture Show (1975), The Amityville Horror (1979), Poltergeist (1982), The Legend of Hell House (1973), House on Haunted Hill (both the 1959 and 1999 versions), The Changeling (1980), What Lies Beneath (2000) and Bloodbath at the House of Death (1984) while also making many references to the slasher flick I Still Know What You Did Last Summer (1998). It also spoofs the comedy film Dude, Where's My Car? (2000) and some contemporary films, such as Hannibal (2001) and Hollow Man (2000). Scary Movie 2 was commercially successful, grossing $141.2 million worldwide from a $45 million budget, but received largely negative reviews from critics. A sequel was released in 2003, grossing $220.7 million against a $48 million budget, and received generally negative reviews.

Plot 
At haunted mansion Hell House, teenage Megan Voorhees becomes possessed by the spirit of Hugh Kane, the house's cruel, wicked previous owner. She interrupts a formal dinner party, thrown by her mother, who seeks help from two priests, Fathers McFeely and Harris. After an unsuccessful attempt to exorcise Kane's ghost, McFeely pulls a gun and shoots Megan.

One year later, Cindy Campbell, Brenda Meeks, Ray Wilkins and Shorty Meeks are at college, trying to live new lives after surviving the events of the first film. Cindy and Brenda are tagged by socially maladjusted Alex. Shorty is still the same stoner he was before. Ray, still confused about his sexuality, has two new male friends, Tommy and Buddy, the latter of whom becomes romantically interested in Cindy. She rebuffs him but agrees to be friends. Immediately after, Buddy runs up behind Cindy and administers a near atomic thong wedgie in the hallways of their high school, thinking this is normal friend behavior. Cindy screams as she is lifted nearly off the ground before Buddy releases her thong, which snaps back against her ass, and Cindy nearly falls to the ground, knees buckled. 

The sinister Professor Oldman and his charming paraplegic assistant, Dwight Hartman, plan to study the paranormal activity at Hell House. They recruit Cindy and her friends as test subjects under the pretense of a psychological experiment on sleep paralysis. At the mansion, Cindy encounters a foul-mouthed parrot and Hanson, a creepy caretaker with a badly malformed hand. Later, the group is joined by the attractive Theo. They sit down for dinner, but soon lose their appetite due to Hanson's repulsive treatment of the food.

That night, Cindy hears voices directing her to a secret room, where she and Buddy discover the diary of Kane's wife. Seeing her portrait, they note Cindy's (slight) resemblance. Meanwhile, the others also experience bizarre encounters. Kane's ghost has sex with Alex in her bedroom, and quickly departs at the mention of commitment. Cindy gets into a fistfight with the house cat, Mr. Kittles. When Cindy tries to tell Oldman, he dismisses it, and sends Theo to take Cindy to bed. Later, Cindy is possessed by Kane's wife, and she seduces Oldman. She quickly returns to normal, with no memory of the event. A toy clown attempts to kill Ray, but in a strange turn of events, the doll is sexually assaulted by Ray instead. A weed-monster rolls Shorty into a joint. It proceeds to smoke him (much to Shorty's enjoyment), but gets distracted and lets him escape. The next morning, Oldman tells Dwight that no one is leaving the house, despite the attacks, and shows his true lecherous nature. Dwight is given the only house keys, and told to give them to nobody. Theo offers oral sex to no avail; Dwight does it to himself. She knocks him out and takes the keys.

Oldman is seduced and killed by the ghost of Kane's mistress, Victoria Crane. Shorty later encounters the same ghost, but charms and has sex with her. After Dwight equips the teens with weapons that can injure their spectral enemy, they are pursued throughout the mansion, Alex attempts to win Kane's love, but is killed by Crane's ghost. Buddy and Cindy are locked in the walk-in freezer. Cindy uses a collection of random objects to produce a Caterpillar 2-Ton tractor and escapes the freezer.

Hanson becomes possessed by Kane and kidnaps an inebriated Shorty. Cindy, Brenda and Theo team up to battle Hanson with highly stylized fight choreography, but are defeated. Dwight regroups with the teens, and Cindy chooses to act as bait to lure Kane into a device that will destroy him. The plan succeeds, freeing the group from the house's curse.

Two months later, Cindy and Buddy are in a relationship. They are out on a walk when Hanson appears to take Cindy away with him. Buddy disappears as Hanson gets hit by a car, driven by Shorty.

Cast 

 Anna Faris as Cindy Campbell
 Shawn Wayans as Ray Wilkins 
 Marlon Wayans as Shorty Meeks
 Regina Hall as Brenda Meeks
 Christopher Masterson as Buddy Sanderson
 Kathleen Robertson as Theo
 David Cross as Dwight Hartman
 Tim Curry as Professor Oldman
 Tori Spelling as Alex Monday
 Chris Elliott as Hanson
 James Woods as Father McFeely
 Andy Richter as Father Harris
 Richard Moll as Hugh Kane (Hell House Ghost)
 Veronica Cartwright as Mrs. Voorhees
 Natasha Lyonne as Megan Voorhees
 Beetlejuice as Shorty's brain
 Matt Friedman (voice) as Polly the parrot 
 Vitamin C (voice) as herself
 Suli McCullough (voice) as Clown
 Jennifer Curran as Victoria Crane, Hugh's mistress

Production 
The film is a sequel to Scary Movie. According to director Keenen Ivory Wayans, the filmmakers watched over 130 horror films for background research. Marlon Brando was originally cast as Father McFeely and completed one day of filming before he had to leave the production due to illness. He was replaced by James Woods who was paid $1 million for four days work.
Charlton Heston had also turned down the Woods role. At one point, former President Bill Clinton, who had just left office the year the film came out, was also considered.

Because Miramax had not greenlit this sequel until the massive box office success of the first, the film faced a punishing production schedule that involved coming up with a script and tearing through production and post-production in a total of less than nine months, roughly half the average time for all those steps to be completed on a standard Hollywood production in 2000–2001. It was this rushed production that made the Wayans never want to make another Scary Movie, and they were not involved in any of the sequels.

Music 
Unlike its predecessor, the film does not have an official soundtrack. It features a heavily hip hop and rap catalogue, with some rock and techno songs.

 "Hello, Dolly!" (Jerry Herman)
 "Shake Ya Ass" – Mystikal
 "Tubular Bells" – Mike Oldfield
 "I Walk Alone" - Oleander
 "Killer Bee" - Meeks
 "If I Had No Loot" - Tony! Toni! Toné!
 "Givin' My Dick Away" - Trace
 "Holiday Party" - Big Daddy
 "Sorry Now" – Sugar Ray
 "Evel Knieval" - Ceasefire V Deadly Avenger
 "U Know What's Up" – Donell Jones
 "Graduation (Friends Forever)" – Vitamin C
 "Let Me Blow Ya Mind" – Eve ft. Gwen Stefani
 "History Repeating" – Propellerheads ft. Shirley Bassey
 "Fever" – Richard Marino & His Orchestra
 "Insane in the Brain" – Cypress Hill
 "Smack My Bitch Up" – The Prodigy
 "Skullsplitter" – Hednoize
 "Ride Wit Me" – Nelly ft. City Spud (played over the end credit sequence)
 "So Erotic" – Casey Crown ft. Jay Dee
 "When It's Dark" – Trace ft. Neb Luv

Release

Home media 
The film was released on VHS and DVD by Buena Vista Home Entertainment under the Dimension Home Video banner on December 18, 2001, with an array of special features, including commentaries and various deleted scenes.

Following the sale of Miramax to Farmyard Holdings, Lionsgate Home Entertainment later reissued the DVD, and released the film on Blu-ray on September 20, 2011.

Reception

Box office 
Scary Movie 2 opened on the Fourth of July weekend and ranked the top spot at the US box office, with $20.5 million. In North America, the film grossed $71.3 million. With $69.9 million internationally, the worldwide gross comes to $141.2 million. Out of the first four Scary Movie films, this was the least successful to date, until the fifth film in 2013.

Critical response 
On Rotten Tomatoes, Scary Movie 2 has an approval rating of 14% based on 112 reviews and an average rating of 3.50/10. The site's critical consensus reads, "Instead of being funny, this gross-out sequel plays like a sloppy, rushed-out product." On Metacritic, the film has a score of 29 out of 100 based on 25 critics, indicating "generally unfavorable reviews". Audiences polled by CinemaScore gave the film an average grade of "B" on an A+ to F scale.

References

External links 

 
 
 
 
 
 

Scary Movie (film series)
2001 films
2001 comedy horror films
2000s American films
2000s English-language films
2000s ghost films
2000s parody films
2000s supernatural horror films
African-American comedy horror films
American comedy horror films
American haunted house films
American parody films
American sequel films
American supernatural comedy films
American supernatural horror films
Dimension Films films
Films about exorcism
Films directed by Keenen Ivory Wayans
Films set in country houses
Films shot in Los Angeles
Films shot in Vancouver
Mad scientist films
Miramax films
Parodies of horror
Stoner films